Schistura beavani, the creek loach, is a species of ray-finned fish in the stone loach genus Schistura. It is a widely distributed species, especially in the Ganges where it can be found in the Indian states of Meghalaya, Uttaranchal, Uttar Pradesh and West Bengal and Nepal, it has also been reported from Bangladesh and its presence in Meghalaya need to be confirmed. Adults are found in fast flowing, clear streams with a pebbly substrate.

References

beavani
Fish described in 1868
Taxa named by Albert Günther